Robin Garnham (born 1 May 1988) is a British handball player. He was born in Karlstad, Sweden. He competed for the British national team at the 2012 Summer Olympics in London. He played for the Norwegian club Fram Larvik.

Personal life
Garnham's father Stuart played professional football, relocating his family to Sweden.

References

External links

1988 births
Living people
Sportspeople from Karlstad
British male handball players
Olympic handball players of Great Britain
Handball players at the 2012 Summer Olympics